Albert Katz (17 July 1858 – 16 December 1923), also known by the pen name Ish ha-Ruaḥ, was a Polish-born rabbi, writer, and journalist.

Biography
Albert Katz was born in Lodz, and studied at the yeshivot of Lublin and Vilna before moving to Berlin in 1881. He served as a rabbi in Fürstenwalde from April 1883 to 1886, and for Congregation Ohel Yitzḥak in Berlin from April 1886 to 1887. From 1887 he devoted himself exclusively to writing.

In 1890 he was hired as editor of the Allgemeine Zeitung des Judentums, eventually becoming its chief editor in 1919. He was also one of the founders of the Vereine für jüdische Literatur und Geschichte of Berlin, and of the Verband der Literatur-Vereine in Hanover (1894), and served as the latter's secretary.

He died on 16 December 1923 at his apartment in Pankow, Berlin, and was buried at the Weißensee Cemetery

Works

  Published in German as Der Jude und das Land seiner Väter.
 
  Translation of I. B. Levinson's Efes Damim.
  Response to August Rohling's anti-Jewish work Der Talmudjude (1871).
 
 
  A collection of stories including Eine Wette, Der Car und der Rabbi, David und Jonathan (adapted from a story by I. L. Peretz), and Der Fasttag.
 
 
  Biographical sketches of Tannaitic scholars.
 
 
  Adapted from a story by Jacob Dinezon.
 
 
  Collection of twenty-seven homiletic essays.

References
 

1858 births
1923 deaths
19th-century German Jews
19th-century German journalists
19th-century German male writers
19th-century German rabbis
German editors
German people of Polish-Jewish descent
German Zionists
People from Pankow
Polish editors
Polish Zionists
Writers from Berlin
Writers from Łódź